Gauripur or Gouripur  may refer to:

 Gouripur, Bangladesh, a town in Mymensingh Division, Bangladesh
 Gouripur Upazila, an upazila centred on the town
 Gauripur, India, a town in Assam, India
 Gouripur Gaon, a village in Assam, India
 Gauripur, Nepal, a village in south-eastern Nepal